Cedar Knolls is an unincorporated community located within Hanover Township in Morris County, New Jersey, United States. It is part of Hanover Township along with Whippany.

Demographics

References

Hanover Township, New Jersey
Unincorporated communities in Morris County, New Jersey
Unincorporated communities in New Jersey